Wayne Pettigrew is a former Republican member of the Oklahoma House of Representatives, where he served from 1994 to 2004. He also sought election in 2012 to the U.S. House representing Oklahoma's 2nd congressional district, but was defeated in the Republican primary on June 26, 2012.

References

Year of birth missing (living people)
Living people
Republican Party members of the Oklahoma House of Representatives
Candidates in the 2012 United States elections